Emperor Jianwen may refer to:
 Emperor Jianwen of Jin (320–372, reigned 371–372), Jin dynasty emperor
 Emperor Jianwen of Liang (503–551, reigned 549–551), Liang dynasty emperor
 Jianwen Emperor (1377–1402, reigned 1398–1402), Ming dynasty emperor